Callerebia scanda, the pallid argus, is a brown (Satyrinae) butterfly that is found in the Himalayas.

Range
The butterfly is found in Afghanistan, and the Himalayas from Safed Koh, Astor, Chilas, Gilgit, Chitral, Kashmir and Kulu eastwards across to Sikkim.

Status
As per William Harry Evans, it is common from Chitral to Sikkim, and not rare westwards.

See also
Satyrinae
Nymphalidae
List of butterflies of India (Satyrinae)

References

 

Satyrini
Fauna of Pakistan
Butterflies of Asia
Butterflies described in 1844